Dilliram Sanyasi (born 14 November 1995) is an Indian professional footballer from Sikkim, who plays as a winger for Rajasthan United FC in the I-League.

Career
Dilliram Sanyasi began his career from the youth setup of Minerva Punjab. He made his professional debut in the 2015–16 I-League 2nd Division against Mohammedan Sporting. 

In April 2020, he signed on a 3 years contract with the East Bengal F.C. Reserves team.

Career statistics

References

External links

1995 births
Living people
Indian footballers
Association football midfielders
Footballers from Sikkim
I-League players
RoundGlass Punjab FC players
East Bengal Club players
Hindustan FC players